The 2006–07 Maryland Terrapins men's basketball team represented the University of Maryland in the 2006–07 college basketball season as a member of the Atlantic Coast Conference (ACC). The team was led by 18th-year head coach Gary Williams. Maryland finished with a 25–9 record, and advanced to the second round of the NCAA tournament, where they were defeated by Butler.

Roster

2006–2007 Schedule and Results

|-
!colspan=9| Regular season

|-
!colspan=9| ACC tournament

|-
!colspan=9| NCAA tournament

References

Maryland Terrapins men's basketball seasons
Maryland
Maryland
Maryland
Maryland